HMS Sorlings was a 32-gun fifth rate vessel built under contract at Shoreham in 1693/94. After commissioning she spent her time in trade protection services between Home Waters, North America, West Indies and the Mediterranean. She was captured by the French in October 1705. Incorporated into the French Navy, she was loaned to the Privateering squadron at Dunkerque then recaptured by the British in 1711 and sold.

She was the second vessel to bear the name Sorlings since it was used for a 28-gun Royalist Ship Named Royal James in 1654. Captured by Parliamentarians in 1654 and renamed Sorlings and Wrecked on 17 December 1717.

Construction and Specifications
She was ordered on 10 April 1693 to be built under contract by Richard Barrett of Shoreham. She was launched on 19 March 1694. Her builder's measure tonnage was calculated as 362 tons (burthen).

The gun armament initially was four demi-culverins mounted on wooden trucks on the lower deck (LD) with two pair of guns per side. The upper deck (UD) battery would consist of between twenty and twenty-two sakers guns mounted on wooden trucks with ten or eleven guns per side. The gun battery would be completed by four to six minions guns mounted on wooden trucks on the quarterdeck (QD) with two to three guns per side.

Commissioned Service - 1694-1705
She was commissioned in 1694 under the command of Captain Fleetwood Ernes for service in New England in 1694, 1695, and 1696. Captain Richard Cotten took command in 1697 for a convoy to Iceland. He was followed by Captain John Worrell. She sailed for Newfoundland in 1698. Upon her return she sailed with a convoy for the Mediterranean arriving at Leghorn in November 1698. On 2 April 1701 she was commissioned under Captain Lord James Dursley (the later Earl of Berkley). In 1702 she was under Captain Jonathan Spann and assigned to Sir George Rooke's Fleet. She sailed to Newfoundland in 1703 then moved on to the Leeward Islands. On 22 August 1703 she was under Captain Thomas Campion until he was dismissed by court martial on 31 March 1704.On 1 April 1704 she was under Captain William Coney for service in the North Sea.

Loss
She was taken by four French warships (including the 30-gun Le Jersey), along with HMS Blackwall and HMS Pendennis while escorting a homeward bond Baltic convoy on 20 October 1705. She was incorporated into the French Navy then loaned to the Dunkerque privateering squadron as Le Sorlingue in 1709. She was retaken by the British in February 1711 and sold.

Notes

Citations

References

 Winfield (2009), British Warships in the Age of Sail (1603 – 1714), by Rif Winfield, published by Seaforth Publishing, England © 2009, EPUB 
 Colledge (2020), Ships of the Royal Navy, by J.J. Colledge, revised and updated by Lt Cdr Ben Warlow and Steve Bush, published by Seaforth Publishing, Barnsley, Great Britain, © 2020, EPUB 
 Lavery (1989), The Arming and Fitting of English Ships of War 1600 - 1815, by Brian Lavery, published by US Naval Institute Press © Brian Lavery 1989, Part V Guns, Type of Guns
 Clowes (1898), The Royal Navy, A History from the Earliest Times to the Present (Vol. II). London. England: Sampson Low, Marston & Company, © 1898
 WinRob (2017), French Warships in the Age of Sail 1626–1786, by Rif Winfield and Stephen S. Roberts, published by Seaforth Publishing, © Rif Winfield & Stephen S. Roberts 2017,  (ePub)

 

Frigates of the Royal Navy
Ships of the Royal Navy
1690s ships